Apradh is a 1972 action thriller romance Hindi film produced and directed by Feroz Khan. It was Feroz Khan's debut as a producer and a director. The film stars Feroz Khan, Mumtaz, Prem Chopra, Iftekhar, Helen, Faryal and Madan Puri. The film's music is by Kalyanji Anandji.

The film is famous for the Indian funk-rock song "Ae Naujawan Hai Sab", sung by Asha Bhosle. The song was later the basis for The Black Eyed Peas' hit song "Don't Phunk with My Heart" in 2005.

Plot
While in Germany, gorgeous looking Rita, who belongs to a gang of thieves, cons a jeweler into parting with a very expensive necklace, and is on the run from the police. She hitches a ride from ace Grand Prix racer, Ram Khanna, and plants the necklace on his person. He later graciously returns the necklace to her, and she in turns it in to her gang-leader. When the gang-leader has the necklace appraised, it turns out to be a fake, and Rita is now on the run from her own gang. She again takes shelter with Ram, tells him the truth and that her real name is Meena. Ram wins the Grand Prix, and both return to India. Upon their entry at the airport, they are searched, and Ram is found to be in possession of diamonds hidden in medicinal capsules. He is immediately arrested, tried in Court, and sentenced to several years in prison. Years later, he is released, and finds Meena awaiting. Both get married and decide to settle down and live life honestly. But trouble comes knocking on their door again - this time, it's Ram's brother, Harnam, who wants Ram to join him in smuggling. Ram initially refuses, but when Meena is abducted, he relents and joins his brother in a career of crime - a change that will have disastrous results for Meena and himself.

Cast
 Feroz Khan  ...  Ram Khanna  
 Mumtaz  ...  Meena / Rita  
 Prem Chopra  ...  Harnam Khanna  
 Faryal  ...  Suzy 
 Iftekhar  ...  Police Inspector  
 Tun Tun  ...  Mrs. Fernandes  
 Polson  ...  Mr. Fernandes

Soundtrack

A sample from the song "Ae Naujawan Hai Sab Kuchh Yahan" was used by The Black Eyed Peas for their hit song "Don't Phunk with My Heart" in 2005. The song won the Black Eyed Peas their first Grammy Award for Best Rap Performance by a Duo or Group, while the composers for "Ae Naujawan Hai Sab Kuchh Yahan", Kalyanji Anandji, were awarded the BMI Award for being the originators of the melodies used in "Don't Phunk with My Heart."

References

External links
 

1972 films
1970s Hindi-language films
Films scored by Kalyanji Anandji
Films directed by Feroz Khan
Indian action thriller films
Films shot in Germany
Films set in Germany
1972 directorial debut films
1970s action thriller films